USS Marshall may refer to more than one United States Navy ship:

 , a destroyer in commission from 1943 to 1969
 USS Hunter Marshall (DE-602), a destroyer escort converted during construction into the high-speed transport 
 , a high-speed transport in commission from 1945 to 1946

United States Navy ship names